Caesar Creek Township is one of fourteen townships in Dearborn County, Indiana. As of the 2010 census, its population was 238 and it contained 119 housing units.

History
Caesar Creek Township was established in 1826.

St. John's Lutheran Church and School was added to the National Register of Historic Places in 1996.

Geography

Unincorporated towns
 Farmers Retreat
(This list is based on USGS data and may include former settlements.)

Major highways
  Indiana State Road 62

Cemeteries
The township contains three cemeteries: Mount Hebron, Rand and Saint Johns.

Education
Caesar Creek Township residents may obtain a library card at the Aurora Public Library in Aurora.

References
 
 United States Census Bureau cartographic boundary files

External links

 Indiana Township Association
 United Township Association of Indiana

Townships in Dearborn County, Indiana
Townships in Indiana
1826 establishments in Indiana
Populated places established in 1826